The 2021 The Challenger was held from September 24 to 26 at the Curlingzentrum Region Basel in Basel, Switzerland. The event was held in a round-robin format with a purse of CHF 4,200.

Team GB Red won the event, topping the previously undefeated Irene Schori 7–5 in the final. GB Red consisted of Eve Muirhead, Vicky Wright, Jennifer Dodds and Hailey Duff. Team Schori topped the round robin with a 4–0 record, followed by GB Red, Silvana Tirinzoni and Anna Hasselborg all at 3–1. Schori then defeated Hasselborg 6–4 in one semifinal and Muirhead's team beat Tirinzoni 7–5 in the other. Teams Kaldvee, Raphaela Keiser, Nora Wüest and GB Blue (Gina Aitken) all missed the playoffs.

Teams
The teams are listed as follows:

Round-robin standings
Final round-robin standings

Round-robin results
All draw times listed in Central European Time (UTC+01:00).

Draw 1
Friday, September 24, 1:00 pm

Draw 2
Friday, September 24, 6:00 pm

Draw 3
Saturday, September 25, 9:00 am

Draw 4
Saturday, September 25, 2:00 pm

Playoffs

Source:

Semifinals
Saturday, September 25, 7:00 pm

Final
Sunday, September 26, 10:00 am

Notes

References

External links
CurlingZone

2021 in women's curling
Women's curling competitions in Switzerland
Sports competitions in Basel
2021 in Swiss sport
September 2021 sports events in Switzerland
21st century in Basel
2021 in Swiss women's sport